Diplazon is a genus of parasitoid wasps belonging to the family Ichneumonidae.

The genus has cosmopolitan distribution.

Species
The following species are recognised in the genus Diplazon:
 
 Diplazon albotibialis Dasch, 1964
 Diplazon angustus Dasch, 1964
 Diplazon anolcus Dasch, 1964
 Diplazon areolatus Ma, Wang & Wang, 1995
 Diplazon aubertiator Diller, 1986
 Diplazon bachmaieri Diller, 1986
 Diplazon bradleyi Dasch, 1964
 Diplazon cascadensis Dasch, 1964
 Diplazon clypearis (Brischke, 1892)
 Diplazon coccinatus (Tosquinet, 1896)
 Diplazon constrictus Dasch, 1964
 Diplazon contiguus (Schiodte, 1839)
 Diplazon deletus (Thomson, 1890)
 Diplazon erugatus Dasch, 1964
 Diplazon fechteri Diller, 1986
 Diplazon festatorius (Costa, 1888)
 Diplazon flavifrons Dasch, 1964
 Diplazon flixi Klopfstein, 2014
 Diplazon galenensis Dasch, 1964
 Diplazon guptai Diller, 1977
 Diplazon heinrichi Diller, 1982
 Diplazon hispanicus (Spinola, 1843)
 Diplazon hyperboreus (Marshall, 1877)
 Diplazon implanus Dasch, 1964
 Diplazon insulcatus Dasch, 1964
 Diplazon kurilensis Klopfstein, 2014
 Diplazon laetatorius (Fabricius, 1781)
 Diplazon luzonensis Baltazar, 1955
 Diplazon marakwetensis (Seyrig, 1935)
 Diplazon mulleolus Dasch, 1964
 Diplazon neoalpinus Zwakhals, 1979
 Diplazon nordicus Klopfstein, 2014
 Diplazon novoguineensis Momoi & Nakanishi, 1968
 Diplazon oralis (Nees, 1830)
 Diplazon orbitalis (Cresson, 1865)
 Diplazon orientalis (Cameron, 1905)
 Diplazon pallicoxa Manukyan, 1987
 Diplazon parvus Klopfstein, 2014
 Diplazon pectoratorius (Thunberg, 1822)
 Diplazon prolatus Dasch, 1964
 Diplazon pullatus Dasch, 1964
 Diplazon punctatus Ma, Wang & Wang, 1995
 Diplazon quadricinctus (Schrank, 1785)
 Diplazon quadrincisus (Spinola, 1851)
 Diplazon ruwenzoriensis (Seyrig, 1935)
 Diplazon ryukyuensis Nakanishi, 1967
 Diplazon schachti Diller, 1986
 Diplazon scrobiculatus Ma, Wang & Wang, 1995
 Diplazon scutatorius Teunissen, 1943
 Diplazon scutellaris (Cresson, 1868)
 Diplazon suigensis Uchida, 1957
 Diplazon tetragonus (Thunberg, 1822)
 Diplazon tibiatorius (Thunberg, 1822)
 Diplazon triangulus Dasch, 1964
 Diplazon urundiensis (Benoit, 1955)
 Diplazon varicoxa (Thomson, 1890)
 Diplazon visayensis Baltazar, 1955
 Diplazon walleyi Dasch, 1964
 Diplazon zetteli Klopfstein, 2014
 BOLD:AAD1879 (Diplazon sp.)
 BOLD:ACZ1884 (Diplazon sp.)
 BOLD:ADL6404 (Diplazon sp.)

References

Ichneumonidae
Ichneumonidae genera